Out of the Ruins is a lost 1928 silent film drama produced and distributed by First National Pictures. John Francis Dillon directed and Richard Barthelmess stars.

Cast
Richard Barthelmess as Lt. Pierre Dumont
Robert Frazer as Paul Gilbert
Marian Nixon as Yvonne Gilbert
Emile Chautard as Pere Gilbert
Bodil Rosing as Mere Gilbert
Eugene Pallette as Volange
Rose Dione as Mere Gourdain

References

External links
Out of the Ruins @ IMDb.com
AllMovie; synopsis
Australian daybill lobby poster
accessible version of poster

1928 films
American silent feature films
Lost American films
Films directed by John Francis Dillon
American black-and-white films
Silent American drama films
1928 drama films
Films with screenplays by Gerald Duffy
1928 lost films
Lost drama films
First National Pictures films
1920s American films